The 5th National Congress of the Chinese Communist Party was convened from April 27 to May 9, 1927 in Wuhan, China. The Republic of China (1912-1949) was the official government of China in that decade, and the Communists were widely discriminated against.  It was certainly preceded by the 4th National Congress. This Congress set in motion the 5th Central Committee. It was succeeded by the 6th National Congress.  It was held right after the Shanghai Massacre. The first Great Communist Revolution in China (1921-1927) had ended, and the Chinese Civil War had begun.

References

1927 conferences
1927 in China
National Congress of the Chinese Communist Party